Beastars (stylized in all caps) is a Japanese manga series written and illustrated by Paru Itagaki. It was serialized in Akita Shoten's Weekly Shōnen Champion from September 2016 to October 2020, with its chapters collected in 22 tankōbon volumes. The manga is licensed for English release in North America by Viz Media. The story takes place in a modern world of civilized, anthropomorphic animals with a cultural divide between carnivores and herbivores, and where eating meat (which always comes from other anthropomorphic animals) is strictly illegal. The series takes its name from the in-universe title of Beastar, an individual of great talent, service, and notoriety.

An anime television series adaptation produced by Orange aired from October to December 2019 on Fuji TV's +Ultra programming block. A second season aired from January to March 2021. A third and final season is set to premiere in 2024. The anime series is licensed by Netflix. The first season premiered outside of Japan in March 2020, and the second in July 2021.

As of October 2021, the manga had over 7.5 million copies in circulation. Beastars has won multiple awards in 2018, including the 11th Manga Taishō, being the first Akita Shoten title to receive it, the New Creator Prize at the Tezuka Osamu Cultural Prize, the 42nd Kodansha Manga Award in the shōnen category and the New Face Award at the 21st Japan Media Arts Festival.

Plot

In a modern and civilized world populated by anthropomorphic animals, there is a cultural divide between the herbivorous animals and the carnivorous animals. Legoshi, a large gray wolf, is a timid and quiet student of Cherryton Academy where he lives in a dorm with several other carnivorous students including his outgoing Labrador friend, Jack. As a member of the school's drama club, Legoshi works as a stagehand and supports the actors of the club headed by the star pupil Louis, a red deer.

Out of nowhere, Tem the alpaca is brutally murdered and devoured in the night, setting off a wave of unease and distrust between the herbivore and carnivore students. At the same time, Legoshi has a fateful encounter with Haru, a dwarf rabbit who has been in love with Louis, and begins developing complex feelings for her.

Media

Manga

Beastars, written and illustrated by Paru Itagaki, was serialized for 196 chapters in Akita Shoten's magazine Weekly Shōnen Champion from September 8, 2016, to October 8, 2020.<ref></p></ref> its chapters were collected in twenty-two individual tankōbon volumes, released from January 6, 2017, to January 8, 2021.

During their panel at Anime NYC 2018, Viz Media announced that they have licensed the manga. The first volume was released on July 16, 2019, and the last on January 17, 2023.

Anime

In February 2019, it was announced that Beastars would get an anime television series adaptation animated by CG studio Orange. Shin'ichi Matsumi directed the series, with Nanami Higuchi handling series composition, Nao Ootsu designing the characters, and Satoru Kōsaki composing the series' music. The series aired from October 10 to December 26, 2019, and aired on Fuji TV's +Ultra anime programming block and other channels. At the conclusion of the TV broadcast, a second season was announced. Animation studio Orange returned to produce the second season, which aired from January 7 to March 25, 2021. On July 20, 2021, studio Orange and Netflix Japan announced that the anime series would be receiving a third season. On December 7, 2021, Studio Orange announced that the continuation would be the final season. It is set to premiere on Netflix in 2024.

ALI performed the series' opening theme song "Wild side", while Yurika performed the series' ending theme songs "Le zoo" (ep. 2, 5, 8 and 9), "Sleeping instinct" (ep. 3, 7 and 10), "Marble" (ep. 4, 6 and 11) and "Floating Story on the Moon" (ep. 12). Both songs are performed by Yoasobi.

Season 1 of Beastars was released on March 13, 2020, on Netflix outside of Japan. Its second season was released on the streaming service on July 15, 2021.

Stage play
On December 4, 2019, the first 2020 magazine issue of Weekly Shōnen Champion announced that a stage play based on the manga was in development. It was originally scheduled for an April 2020 debut running through May in Tokyo and Osaka. In late March 2020, it was announced that the play has been cancelled due to the COVID-19 pandemic. However, there are plans to have it postponed instead.

Reception

Manga
As of October 2021, Beastars had over 7.5 million copies in circulation.

In December 2017, the series placed second in the list of top male-targeted manga for 2018 in the Kono Manga ga Sugoi! guidebook, placing after The Promised Neverland. The series won the 11th annual Manga Taishō in March 2018, the first time a series from Akita Shoten took the award. In April 2018, it won the New Creator Prize at the 22nd Tezuka Osamu Cultural Prizes. In May 2018, it won the award for Best Shōnen Manga at the 42nd annual Kodansha Manga Awards. It also won a New Face Award at the 21st Japan Media Arts Festival Awards in March 2018. The series won the "Shonen Tournament 2019" by the editorial staff of the French website manga-news. It was nominated for the Best U.S. Edition of International Material—Asia at the 2020 Eisner Award. Beastars won the Best Graphic Story and Best Dramatic Series in the Ursa Major Award. The Ursa Major awards are given in the field of furry fandom works and are the main awards in the field of anthropomorphism. The manga was chosen as one of the Best Manga at the Comic-Con International Best & Worst Manga of 2019. Beastars was nominated for the 53rd Seiun Award in the Best Comic category in 2022.

Anime
On Rotten Tomatoes, the show holds an approval rating of 94%, based on 18 reviews, with an average rating of 8.1/10. The website's critical consensus reads: "Well-made and beautifully animated, Beastars is a solid new anime for anyone looking to get a little wild."

In 2020, the series was part of the Jury Selections at the 23rd Japan Media Arts Festival in the Animation category. Beastars won a CGWORLD Award in the Computer Animation category. It won the 26th Spanish Manga Barcelona award for the Best Anime category in 2020. The anime series was awarded the "Best Opening Sequence" and was nominated in 8 other categories including "Anime of The Year" in the 5th Crunchyroll Anime Awards; while the second season was nominated in three categories in the 6th Crunchyroll Anime Awards in 2022.

References

External links
 
 
 at Netflix
 at Viz Media

2019 anime television series debuts
+Ultra
Akita Shoten manga
Amputees in fiction
Anime series based on manga
Animated television series about animals
Cannibalism in fiction
Comics about animals
Coming-of-age anime and manga
Drama anime and manga
Fantasy anime and manga
Fiction about creatures
Fuji TV original programming
Human trafficking in fiction
Japanese computer-animated television series
Manga Taishō
Netflix original anime
Orange (animation studio)
Shōnen manga
Toho Animation
Vegetarianism in fiction
Viz Media manga
Winner of Kodansha Manga Award (Shōnen)
Winner of Tezuka Osamu Cultural Prize (New Artist Prize)
Yakuza in anime and manga